Dorcadion atlantis is a species of beetle in the family Cerambycidae. It was described by Bedel in 1921. It is known from Morocco.

See also 
Dorcadion

References

atlantis
Beetles described in 1921